Peter Hyams (born July 26, 1943) is an American film director, screenwriter and cinematographer known for directing 1978 conspiracy thriller film Capricorn One (which he also wrote), the 1981 science fiction-thriller Outland, the 1984 science fiction film 2010: The Year We Make Contact (a sequel to Stanley Kubrick's 2001: A Space Odyssey), the 1986 action/comedy Running Scared, the comic book adaptation Timecop, the action film Sudden Death (both starring Jean-Claude Van Damme), and the horror films The Relic and End of Days.

Biography

Early life
Hyams was born in New York City, New York, the son of Ruth Hurok and Barry Hyams, who was a theatrical producer and publicist on Broadway. His maternal grandfather was Sol Hurok, the Russian Jewish impresario. His stepfather was blacklisted conductor Arthur Lief. His sister is casting director Nessa Hyams. His son John Hyams is also a film director.

Television
Hyams studied art and music at Hunter College and Syracuse University, before working as a producer/anchorman for WHDH-TV. During 1966 while working for a CBS owned station in New York, he served three months as a news correspondent in Vietnam. He worked in Boston then in January 1968 he joined WBBM-TV as an anchorman and reporter to replace Fahey Flynn. A contemporary report described him as a "glamor type".

During his time with CBS (where he worked from 1964 to 1970), he began to shoot documentary films.

Screenwriter
Hyams moved to Los Angeles in 1970 where he sold his first screenplay, T.R. Baskin, to Paramount Pictures in 1971. Herbert Ross directed the film and Hyams produced.

Directing
Hyams made his directorial debut with an ABC Movie of the Week for Aaron Spelling, Rolling Man (1972) starring Dennis Weaver. Hymans worked on it solely as director, with the script being written by the producers.

Hyams followed it directing another TV movie which he also wrote, Goodnight, My Love (1972), about a private eye and a dwarf. The film was very acclaimed.

Hyams optioned a novel Going All the Way which he intended to adapt and direct but it was not made.

The praise for Goodnight My Love meant Hyams was able to get finance for his debut feature as writer-director, Busting (1974), a buddy cop movie starring Elliott Gould and Robert Blake. He followed it with Our Time (1974), a romance with Pamela Sue Martin, which he directed only.

Hyams made Peeper (1975), for the producers of Busting with Michael Caine and Natalie Wood. It was a financial failure and Hyams' career was at a low ebb. He wrote the script Hanover Street which he could have sold outright but Hyams insisted on directing. He wrote the screenplay for the Charles Bronson thriller Telefon (1977), doing a draft for Richard Lester (who ended up not directing the film). It was rewritten extensively.

Capricorn One
Hyams had written the script for Capricorn One (1978), a number of years earlier. It was a conspiracy thriller about a faked mission to Mars. Paul Lazarus managed to raise finance with Hyams as director and the film was his first hit.

This was followed by the less successful Hanover Street (1979) which starred Harrison Ford.

Hyams did a rewrite of Ted Leighton's screenplay for the Steve McQueen film The Hunter (1980) which he was to direct. However he dropped out after clashes with McQueen.

He wanted to do a Western but was unable to get financing so he then wrote and directed the science fiction cult classic Outland (1981), which starred Sean Connery in a 'High Noon' scenario set on Io, one of Jupiter's moons.

Hyams directed the thriller The Star Chamber (1983), starring Michael Douglas, also rewriting the script.

MGM
For MGM Hyams produced, directed, and wrote the screenplay for 2010 (1984), collaborating closely with author Arthur C. Clarke (2010).

Hyams also co-authored with Clarke The Odyssey File: The Making of 2010, published 1985, a collection of their email correspondence which illustrates their fascination with the then pioneering medium, and its use for them to communicate on an almost daily basis while planning and producing the film.

Hyams directed an episode of Amazing Stories, "The Amazing Falsworth".

Hyams had a hit with a buddy cop film, Running Scared (1986) at MGM with Gregory Hines and Billy Crystal.

He followed it with The Presidio (1988), another buddy action film, starring Sean Connery and Mark Harmon. In between he executive produced the 1980s cult kids movie The Monster Squad (1987).

Less popular was Narrow Margin (1990), a remake of the 1952 film, and the comedy Stay Tuned (1992).

Jean-Claude Van Damme
Hyams had a big hit with the Jean-Claude Van Damme film Timecop (1994). The director and actor subsequently reteamed on Sudden Death (1995) which did less well. 

Hyams did a horror monster movie called The Relic (1997) which received mixed reviews and grossed $48 million at the box office.

The blockbuster End of Days (1999) starring Arnold Schwarzenegger is the highest-grossing film in Hyams' career, grossing over $200 million at the worldwide box-office but was met with negative critical reception.

Hyams followed with The Musketeer (2001), a new version of the novel by Alexandre Dumas, which was a minor box office success.

However, his next film, A Sound of Thunder (2005), a science-fiction movie, had serious difficulties during its production (including the bankruptcy of the original production company during post-production), performed particularly badly at the box office worldwide and was poorly received by critics.

He directed an episode of the series Threshold (2005).

In 2007, it was reported that he would direct the remake of his own Capricorn One; instead he directed the remake of the 1956 film noir Beyond a Reasonable Doubt starring Michael Douglas, which was released in 2009, was a box office flop, and panned by critics.

Reunion with Van Damme
He also contributed the cinematography to his son John's effort, Universal Soldier: Regeneration, the third official Universal Soldier sequel starring Jean-Claude Van Damme and Dolph Lundgren.

Hyams directed the thriller Enemies Closer which began filming in late 2012. It marked his fourth (third directorial) collaboration with Jean-Claude Van Damme.

O.J.: Made in America
Hyams was interviewed by Ezra Edelman in the latter's documentary O.J.: Made in America, which touched on Hyams' former friendship with O. J. Simpson, whom he had directed in Capricorn One. In his interview, Hyams revealed his initial belief that Simpson was innocent of murdering his ex-wife Nicole Brown Simpson and her friend Ron Goldman, but began to have doubts following the revelation of DNA evidence that suggested otherwise. Hyams said he felt particularly betrayed when Simpson continued to insist that he was innocent when Hyams' friend also began to voice his doubts about Simpson's innocence. Following Simpson's acquittal, Hyams stated that he found the African-American celebration of the acquittal to be particularly offensive and hurtful, and later severed his ties with Simpson.

Personal life
On December 19, 1964, he married George-Ann Spota, with whom he has three sons. His first son Chris Hyams is the CEO of the job search website Indeed. His second son John Hyams is also a film director; Peter performed cinematography duties on his son's film Universal Soldier: Regeneration.  His third son Nick Hyams works as a battle rap promoter and host under the name Lush One.

Trademark
Hyams is known for being his own cinematographer on the movies he directs since 1984.

As a reference to his wife's family, there is a minor character named Spota in many of his films, including those which he only wrote (such as 1980's The Hunter); the exceptions being A Sound of Thunder (although there was a market called "Spota's"), End of Days (although there was a bar called "Spota's"), Narrow Margin, Running Scared, 2010, Hanover Street and Peeper.

Filmography

Films

Television

References

External links
 
 

American cinematographers
Film directors from New York City
American television journalists
American male screenwriters
Jewish American writers
American people of Russian-Jewish descent
Writers from Los Angeles
Writers from New York City
American war correspondents
Hugo Award-winning writers
1943 births
Living people
Hunter College alumni
Syracuse University alumni
Science fiction film directors
Film directors from Los Angeles
American male journalists
American science fiction writers
Screenwriters from New York (state)
Screenwriters from California
21st-century American Jews